Pierre Joseph Lavielle (3 March 1873 – April 1936) was a French gymnast. He competed in the men's individual all-around event at the 1900 Summer Olympics.

References

External links

1873 births
1936 deaths
French male artistic gymnasts
Olympic gymnasts of France
Gymnasts at the 1900 Summer Olympics
Sportspeople from Landes (department)